A list of books and essays about David Lean:

Lean
Bibliography